Mzikayise Mashaba (born 13 January 1989) is a South African international footballer who most plays for Chippa United as a midfielder.

Career
Born in Johannesburg, Mashaba previously played club football for Platinum Stars, Free State Stars and Bidvest Wits.

He made his international debut for South Africa in 2012.

References

1989 births
Living people
South African soccer players
South Africa international soccer players
Association football midfielders
Bidvest Wits F.C. players
Free State Stars F.C. players
Platinum Stars F.C. players
Mamelodi Sundowns F.C. players
Chippa United F.C. players
South African Premier Division players
Soccer players from Johannesburg